Illinois's sole member was re-elected August 4, 1828.

See also 
 1828 and 1829 United States House of Representatives elections
 List of United States representatives from Illinois

1828
Illinois
United States House of Representatives